Antonietti is an Italian surname. Notable people with the surname include:

 Benjamin Antonietti (born 1991), Swiss ice hockey player
 Eliot Antonietti (born 1993), Swiss ice hockey player
 Paola Antonietti (born 1980), Italian mathematician

See also

Antonietta (given name)
Antonetti
Maurizio Antoninetti

Italian-language surnames
Patronymic surnames
Surnames from given names